, nicknamed "Moro", is a former Nippon Professional Baseball outfielder and the current coach of the Chiba Lotte Marines.

References

External links

1969 births
Living people
Chiba Lotte Marines players
Japanese baseball coaches
Japanese baseball players
Nippon Professional Baseball coaches
Nippon Professional Baseball outfielders
Baseball people from Fukushima Prefecture